Mariya Mahmoud Bunkure is the commissioner for higher education in Kano State, Nigeria. She was appointed by the Governor of Kano State, Alhaji Abdullahi Umar Ganduje.

Early life and education 
Mariya Mahmoud Bunkure was  born in Bunkure town of Kano State.

Career  
She announced 26 October 2020 as the fixed date for reopening of the state-owned tertiary education institutions, after seven months of closure due to the COVID-19 pandemic in the State.

External links 
 Official website of the Kano State Government

References 

Living people
People from Kano State
Hausa people
Nigerian women in politics
Year of birth missing (living people)
Commissioners of state ministries in Nigeria